Bavdhan is a suburb located along the Western Metropolitan Corridor of Pune, India. Just off the Mumbai-Bangalore national highway, Bavdhan serves as the outlet for Mumbai-Pune expressway. Central Bavdhan, consisting of Chandani Chowk, is bordered by Pashan on the North, Bhugaon village on the West, NDA reserved forest area on the South and Kothrud on its Eastbound Exit.

Administration
Bavdhan is part of the Khadakwasla (Vidhan Sabha constituency). It has two ward representatives in Pune Municipal Corporation.

Transportation
Bavdhan is well connected to Kothrud, Paud Road, Baner, Aundh, Pashan, Pune University, and Sus via excellent roads. The Shivajinagar railway station is about 10 km away (30 mins), the Pune Junction railway station is about 14 km (40-45 mins) away and the Pune airport about 22 km away (60-75 mins). Direct buses are available from Bavdhan to Pune Municipal Corporation, University Circle, Hinjawadi, Pashan Circle, Kothrud, Karve road, Deccan Gymkhana, Marketyard and Pune Station.

Lifestyle 
Bavdhan has quite a few defence establishments, making it green and well maintained. The 'Necklace Garden' which passes through the DRDO estate happens to be a go-to choice for many health enthusiasts. Most of the residents enjoy walking, running or cycling on this beautifully winding road over the pavements.

References

Neighbourhoods in Pune